Arthur Eugene Livingston from the University of Notre Dame, was awarded the status of Fellow in the American Physical Society, after they were nominated by their Division of Atomic, Molecular & Optical Physics in 1998, for his contributions to the understanding of relativistic, QED, and Rydberg state atomic structures through the spectroscopy of highly-charged ions, and for precise determinations of excited-state lifetimes involving allowed and forbidden atomic transitions.

References 

Fellows of the American Physical Society
American physicists
Living people
Year of birth missing (living people)